Thomas James Wright (born 21 October 1944) is a former footballer who played as a right-back. A one-club man, he played for Everton, with whom he won the Football League and the FA Cup, and represented England, including at the 1970 FIFA World Cup.

Club career
Wright was born in Norris Green, Liverpool. He joined Everton as an apprentice, and made his first team debut in 1964. He was part of the winning team in the 1966 FA Cup Final, in the unsuccessful team in the 1968 FA Cup Final and played all 42 league games in the 1969–70 season when Everton won the Football League Championship by nine points. He also won the 1970 FA Charity Shield. He made 437 appearances in total and scored four goals.

Wright has often been described as the best right-back to play for Everton. George Best once described Wright as his most difficult opponent.

International career
Wright made twelve appearances for England including the classic match against Brazil in the 1970 World Cup in Mexico. Wright made his debut for England in the game in which England beat the Soviet Union in the third place match in the 1968 European Football Championship in Italy, the only player to make his England debut in a European Championship finals match.

Retirement
Wright retired in 1974 due to injury. His contributions to Everton were noted in the years following his retirement. He was named as an inaugural member of Gwladys Street's Hall of Fame in 1996, and as an "Everton Giant" in 2016.

References

Everton – School of Science by James Corbett Pan Books 2003 

1944 births
Living people
People from Norris Green
English footballers
Footballers from Liverpool
Association football defenders
England international footballers
England under-23 international footballers
English Football League players
Everton F.C. players
UEFA Euro 1968 players
1970 FIFA World Cup players
FA Cup Final players